The Second You Sleep is the debut studio album by Danish rock band Saybia.

Track listing

Musicians
 Søren Huss – vocals, acoustic guitar
 Jeppe Langebek Knudsen – bass
 Palle Sørensen – drums
 Sebastian Sandstrøm – guitar
 Jess Jenson – keyboards

External links
International fansite
Official website

2002 albums
EMI Records albums
Saybia albums
European Border Breakers Award-winning albums